Thomas Lynch Jr. (August 5, 1749 – December 17, 1779) was a signer of the United States Declaration of Independence as a representative of South Carolina and a Founding Father of the United States. His father was a member of the Continental Congress who had signed the 1774 Continental Association, and when he stepped down because of illness Lynch Jr. was selected to fill his post.

Early life 

Lynch Jr. was born at Hopsewee Plantation in Prince George Parish, Winyah, in what is now Georgetown, South Carolina, the son of Thomas Lynch and his wife, Beverly Allston Lynch. Before Thomas Lynch Jr. was born, his parents had two daughters named Sabina and Esther who were born in 1747 and 1748.

His mother was the daughter of Gilliém Marshall Dé'Illiard of Iberville Parish, Louisiana, whose brother George William Dilliard of Virginia is credited with changing the Dilliard name to its current spelling, made introductions during a ball held at the childhood home of John Drayton Sr., Magnolia Plantation and Gardens. Also in attendance were prominent families such as the Middleton's, Randolph's, and Rutledge. In this marriage they gave birth to a daughter named Aimeé Constance in 1755, who later married John Drayton.

Lynch's grandfather was Jonas Lynch from County Galway ancestral line; the Lynch family were expelled from Ireland following their defeat in the Irish wars of William of Orange. Lynch Sr. had emigrated from Kent, England, to South Carolina. Lynch Sr. was a prominent figure in South Carolina politics which contributed to access of opportunity in high education and wealth.

Lynch Jr. was schooled at the Indigo Society School in Georgetown before his parents sent him to England, where he received honors at Eton College and at Gonville and Caius College, Cambridge. He studied law and political philosophy at the Middle Temple in London. His father admired his English education and encouraged him to remain in Great Britain to study law and the principles of the British constitution. After eight years away from America, he returned to South Carolina in 1772. Although it was his father's dream, Thomas Lynch Jr. decided to end his pursuit of a profession in law.

Lynch Jr. married Paige Shubrick on May 14, 1772. Following their marriage, the couple lived at Peach Tree Plantation which was located in close proximity to his homeland plantation. He enjoyed cultivating the land and remained active in political dialogue in his community.

His father died from a stroke in December, 1776, his mother later married another influential political figure, South Carolina Governor William Moultrie. His sister Sabina Hope Lynch married James Hamilton; one of their sons was James Hamilton Jr., who became governor in the state in 1830.

Career

Lynch was elected a member of the Provincial Congress on February 11, 1775. This committee was formed to prepare a plan of government and represent the people of South Carolina. Lynch served alongside Charles Cotesworth Pinckney, John Rutledge, Charles Pinckney, Henry Laurens, Christopher Gadsden, Rawlins Lowndes, Arthur Middleton, Henry Middleton, Thomas Bee, and Thomas Heyward Jr. in the Provincial Congress. This group formed the South Carolina constitution. Many people objected to this document including the Continental Congress. It stood as a temporary constitution as many believed there would be reconciliation with Great Britain.

Lynch became a company commander in the First South Carolina regiment on June 12, 1775. He was commissioned by the Provincial Congress. After being appointed, he gathered men and led a march into Charlestown, South Carolina. Amid the march, he became very sick with a bilious fever which prevented him from continuing. When he recovered, he was unable to fulfill his position. During his recovery, he received news about his father's declining health. In hope that he could manage his father's illness, Lynch asked his commanding officer, Colonel Christopher Gadsden, if he could travel to Philadelphia. His request was denied originally, but after receiving news of his election to the Continental Congress, he was allowed to travel to his father.

On March 23, 1776, the General Assembly of South Carolina named Lynch to the Continental Congress as a sixth delegate. Although he was ill, Lynch Jr. traveled to Philadelphia to sign the Declaration of Independence. Thomas Lynch Sr. and Thomas Lynch Jr. were the only father and son to serve in the Continental Congress. He was the second youngest delegate in the Continental Congress and filled in his father's place due to illness. The youngest signer, South Carolinian Edward Rutledge, was younger by three months.

Less than a month after signing the Declaration of Independence, Lynch threatened that South Carolina would secede from the United States in a threat representing the interests his constituents. "If it is debated, whether their Slaves are their Property, there is an End of the Confederation."

After signing the Declaration of Independence, an ill Thomas Lynch Jr. set out for home with his ailing father. On the way to South Carolina, his father suffered a second stroke and died in Annapolis, Maryland, in December 1776. Thomas Lynch Jr. retired in early 1777.

Death
After two more years of illness in South Carolina, where he resided with his wife at Peachtree Plantation on the South Santee River, many suggested that he travel to Europe in search for a different atmosphere. He and his wife sailed for respite on the brigantine Polly to St. Eustatius in the West Indies on December 17, 1779. The ship is known to have disappeared shortly after, standing as the last record of his life, and he and his wife were lost at sea. At age 30, he was the youngest signer of the Declaration of Independence to die.

Before dying at sea, he made a will requiring that the heirs of his female relatives change their last name to Lynch in order to inherit his family estate. His sister, Sabina responded by changing her name. She and her husband owned and managed the Peachtree Plantation until their son was of age. Their son, John Bowman Lynch and his wife had three male children. Henry C. Lynch died in 1843 (1828-1843).  Thomas B. Lynch died in the American Civil War.(1821-1864).  James (N.M.) Lynch died in 1887 (1822-1887). Upon the death of Sabina, the estate passed to Lynch's youngest sister Aimeé Constance Dé'Illiard Drayton in accordance with his will that the estate remain in the family.

Legacy
Lynch's birthplace was the Hopsewee Plantation. It is on the National Register of Historic Places and was declared a National Historic Landmark in 1971.

In his 1856 book, Lives of the Signers to the Declaration of Independence Rev. Charles A Goodrich lauds Lynch "as a man of exalted views and exalted moral worth". Goodrich continues to describe him "In all the relations of life, whether as a husband, a friend, a patriot, or the master of the slave, he appeared conscious of his obligations, and found his pleasure in discharging them."

Autographs by Thomas Lynch Jr. are among the rarest by signers of the Declaration of Independence. His time in Congress lasted less than a year, and much of this time was spent in poor health. Only a single letter has survived, along with a few signatures on historical documents. Many of his autographs have scattered, and others were lost in a fire. Today, Lynch's autograph sells for as much as $250,000.

See also
 List of people who disappeared mysteriously at sea
 Memorial to the 56 Signers of the Declaration of Independence

References

External links

 
 Hopsewee Plantation
 
 

1749 births
1770s missing person cases
1779 deaths
18th-century American politicians
Alumni of Gonville and Caius College, Cambridge
American revolutionaries
American slave owners
Continental Congressmen from South Carolina
Members of the Middle Temple
People educated at Eton College
People from Georgetown, South Carolina
People lost at sea
Signers of the United States Declaration of Independence
Founding Fathers of the United States